Eli Artola is a Spanish former international football forward who played for Oiartzun.
She has played for the national team.

Early life

Born in 1969, Artola started playing football at school.

Club career

Artola started her career with Oiartzun. She helped establish the women's team with her father, Inaki Artola. After that, she helped Oiartzun win the División de Honor and the Copa de la Reina twice.

International career

Artola played for the Spain women's national football team.

Honours

Club
Oiartzun

División de Honor (3)
 1991
Copa de la Reina
 1987, 1988

References

1967 births
Living people
Spain women's international footballers
Primera División (women) players
Women's association football forwards
Spanish women's footballers
Oiartzun KE players